Shahrdari Tabriz Cultural and Athletic Club (Bashgah-e Futbal-e Vârzeshi-ye Shiherdari Tebriz) was an Iranian sports club most widely known for its professional football team based in Tabriz, Iran.

Shahrdari Tabriz also has futsal, basketball, road cycling, and volleyball teams.

They were promoted to the Iran Pro League after their performance in the 2012–13 season, but their promotion was revoked due to their involvement in a match-fixing scandal, and they were relegated one division to League 2. Shahrdari stopped all their professional teams in order not to accept the FFIRI's penalty. The team's license was moved to Pashazadeh Company.

Club history

The birth of the club
 
In 1979 Tabriz Firefighters Sports Club was formed in the city of Tabriz and started competing in the 2nd Division of the local leagues of Tabriz. They were eventually promoted to the top flight in Tabriz, and in 1985 they were renamed to Shahrdari Tabriz Sports and Cultural Club. The club eventually became one of the best teams in Tabriz alongside Tractor and Machine Sazi.

Golden Age
In 1993 Shahrdari defeated Tractor to become champions of the East Azerbaijan Province League and earned a spot in the national 2nd Division. A year later they were promoted to the Azadegan League, then the first tier of Iranian football. In their first year Shahrdari finished fourth in their group. In the 1995–96 season however, Shahrdari were relegated back to the 2nd Division. The next season they became champions of the 2nd Division and once again were promoted to the Azadegan League.

Promotion and relegation
Shahrdari Tabriz won promotion to the Persian Gulf Pro League after a 2–0 win at Mashhad and Sanat Naft's 2–1 loss at Isfahan against Sepahan Novin on June 11, 2010, ending an 11 year absence from the top division and finishing as champions in the Azadegan League.

Shahrdari was relegated at the end of the 2011–12 season. They won promotion back to the Persian Gulf Cup the following year but were relegated to the 2nd Division because of a match-fixing scandal. Shahrdari finished 2nd in the 2013–14 season and were promoted to the Azadegan League for the 2014–15 season. In the 2014–15 season, Shahrdari only escaped relegation after defeating Esteghlal Ahvaz in the relegation play-off. Before the 2015–16 season, due to financial problems, Shahrdari dropped out of the Azadegan League and were placed in the 2nd Division. Machine Sazi took their place in the Azadegan League.

In 2017, Shahrdari returned to the Azadegan League after finishing first in Group A.

Season-by-season
The table below chronicles the achievements of Shahrdari Tabriz in various competitions since 1990.

Club managers
  Adrian Szabo (1995–1996)
  Bijan Zolfagharnasab (1997–1998)
  Mohammad Hossein Ziaei (September 2008 – July 2009)
  Akbar Misaghian (July 2009 – October 2010)
  Hamid Derakhshan (October 2010 – June 2011)
  Miodrag Ješić (June 2011 – December 2011)
  Ali Asghar Modir Roosta (December 2011 – May 2012)
  Bijan Azizi (interim) (May 2012)
  Faraz Kamalvand (May 2012 – April 2013)
  Mehdi Pashazadeh (August 2013 – January 2015)
  Khodadad Azizi (January 2015 – July 2015)
  Gholamreza Baghabadi (July 2015 – May 2016)
  Ali Saleh-Panahi (June 2016 – October 2017)
  Sirous Dinmohammadi (October 2017 – Present)

Honours
Azadegan League
 Winner (1): 2009–10

2nd Division
 Winner (1): 2016–17
 Runner Up (3): 1996–97, 2005–06, 2013–14

3rd Division
 Winner (1): 2003–04

 East Azerbaijan League
 Winners (3): 1990–91, 1993–94, 2002–03

See also
 Shahrdari Tabriz Futsal Club
 Shahrdari Tabriz Volleyball Club
 Tabriz Shahrdary Team

References

External links
 Official website (Persian)
 Shahrdari FC Fans

Football clubs in Iran
Sport in Tabriz
1986 establishments in Iran